Eric Chan (born 1963
) and Heather Schatz (born 1968) are artists based in New York City who worked collaboratively under the name ChanSchatz.

Chan was born in Tokyo and Schatz in Dallas.  The couple make works based on information gathered from invited guests to their studio using a mixture of traditional and digital techniques.
The collected data is transformed into large-scale paintings and silkscreened images.  Their work references ideas of identity and social relationships through their openly collaborative process.

The parties filed for divorce in 2015 and were parties to a suit in Federal Court in New York, New York regarding authorship rights.

Selected exhibitions
1998
XXIV Bienal de São Paulo, São Paulo, Brazil
1999
The Production of Production, Apex Art Curatorial Program, New York
Too Wide Enough, Swiss Institute New York
2000
Representing: A Show of Identities, Parrish Art Museum, Southampton
2003
City Mouse/Country Mouse, Space 101, Brooklyn
Before and After Science, Marella Contemporary Art, Milan
dsp.0034, Contemporary Arts Forum, Santa Barbara
2004
Multiple Strategies, Contemporary Arts Center, Cincinnati
2006
Mutiny, The Happy Lion, Los Angeles
Here and There, Massimo Audiello, New York
2007
Blood Meridian, Galerie Michael Janssen, Berlin
Together, Hunter Museum of American Art, Chattanooga
In Situ, Galerie Michael Janssen, Cologne
2008
Paragons, University of Toronto, Toronto
Lever House, New York
2010
Looking for the Face I Had Before the World Was Made, MCA Denver

References

External links
Article from Akrylic.com
ChanSchatz on ArtNet.com
Artists’ official site
ChanSchatz on ArtFacts.net
Further information from the Saatchi Gallery

ChanScahtz